Clemens Pickel (born August 17, 1961, in Colditz, Saxony, Germany) is a German-Russian Roman Catholic prelate, and Bishop of Saratov, Russia. Pickel is the current chairman of the Episcopal Conference of Russia.

Education

From 1968 till 1978 he learned at school, in 1978–1981 in the pre-seminary «Norbertinum» in Magdeburg. In 1981–1986 Pickel studied at the Graduate Theological Seminary "St. Albert the Great" in Erfurt, in 1987/1988 in the pastoral seminary in Neuzelle.

Priesthood

Pickel was ordained a deacon on December 19, 1987, and a priest on June 25, 1988. From 1988–1990 he was vicar of the parish of St. Mary Magdalene in the town Kamenz (Saxony). On August 1, 1990 he was released for pastoral work in the USSR. From 1990 he was engaged in pastoral activities in the territory of former Soviet republics. In 1990/1991 he worked as vicar in the parishes in Tajikistan (Dushanbe, Kurgan-Tyube, Vakhsh). From 1991 the rector of the parish of Christ the King in Marx. From 1992 to 1998 he was dean in the Pavolskaga region, since 1998 member of the Apostolic Administration of priests to Catholics of Latin rite of the European part of Russia. On March 23, 1998 Pope John Paul II appointed him Titular Bishop Husyry. Episcopal ordination was on June 7, 1998 in Marks, when he became the youngest bishop in Europe. On November 23, 1999 Apostolic Administrator of the South European part of Russia. From 1999 Member of the Conference of Catholic Bishops of Russia, Chairman of the Commission on Affairs of the parishioners, and youth movements and the Commission KKER "pastoral – a vocation." Since 2001 he is a member of the Pontifical Council "Cor unum". On February 11, 2002 he became bishop of the Diocese of Saint Clement in Saratov. On December 15, 2003 Pickel finally got a residence permit in Russia.

External links
 http://www.sibgerold.ru/circ_Pikkel.php
 https://web.archive.org/web/20030920233537/http://religion.ng.ru/printed/facts/2002-06-19/6_nationality.html
 http://www.catholic-hierarchy.org/bishop/bpickel.html
 https://web.archive.org/web/20050505115215/http://www.strana.ru/stories/02/04/22/2780/169727.html
 https://web.archive.org/web/20071216111303/http://www.cecr.ru/conf/southern.php
 http://www.kathtube.com/player.php?id=7775
 http://www.kath-ru.blogspot.com.br

21st-century Roman Catholic bishops in Russia
Living people
1961 births
People from Colditz
German expatriates in Russia
German expatriate bishops
German Roman Catholic bishops